A cricket team representing the Nottinghamshire Cricket Board played five List A cricket matches between 1999 and 2002. This is a list of the players who appeared in those matches.

Aquib Afzaal, 1 match, 2001
Vikram Atri, 1 match, 2001
Richard Bates, 1 match, 2002
Travis Binnion, 1 match, 2002
Stephen Brogan, 2 matches, 1999–2000
James Cameron, 1 match, 2000
Murray Creed, 3 matches, 2001–2002
Mark Footitt, 1 match, 2001
Jamie Hart, 2 matches, 2001
Jamil Hassan, 1 match, 1999	
James Hindson, 4 matches, 2000–2002
Richard Hodgkinson, 1 match, 2001
Zahid Iqbal, 2 matches, 1999–2002
Andrew Jackman, 4 matches, 1999–2002
Rahim Karim, 1 match, 2000
William Kirby, 1 match, 2000
Nadeem Malik, 1 match, 2000
Simon Neal, 1 match, 1999
Bhavesh Patel, 1 match, 2001
Richard Pilgrim, 1 match, 2001
Stephen Randall, 1 match, 1999
Paul Riley, 1 match, 2002
Tom Savill, 2 matches, 2001
Mark Saxelby, 1 match, 2000
Peter Scott, 1 match, 2001
Bilal Shafayat, 2 matches, 2000–2001
Rashid Shafayat, 1 match, 1999
Suneal Sharma, 1 match, 2002
Jonathan Shaw, 1 match, 1999
Simon Shipp, 1 match, 2000
Wayne Spooner, 1 match, 1999
Aaron Thomas, 2 matches, 2001
Karl Thomas, 1 match, 1999
Chris Tolley, 2 matches, 2001
Mark Tournier, 1 match, 2002
John Wakeling, 1 match, 1999
Peter Wilshaw, 1 match, 2002
Richard Wyld, 3 matches, 2000–2002

References

Nottinghamshire Cricket Board
Wicket-keepers